The discography of musical group the Bee Gees consists of 39 albums (including 22 studio albums) and 83 singles. In a career spanning more than 50 years, the “Kings of Disco” have already sold over 220 million records worldwide, becoming among the best-selling music artists in history. Billboard ranked them as the 28th Greatest Artist[s] of All Time. According to RIAA, the Bee Gees have sold 28 million certified albums in the United States.

Saturday Night Fever is in the top five best-selling albums to date, selling over 50 million copies worldwide (16× Platinum in the US). Billboard also ranked them as the 14th Greatest Hot 100 Artist of all time. They have scored 9 No. 1 hits on the Billboard Hot 100, including 15 top ten hits and 43 chart entries overall. Spirits Having Flown has sold over 30 million copies worldwide, marking yet another huge success for the trio.

Albums

Studio albums

Compilation albums

Live albums

Soundtracks

Video albums

Singles

1960s

1970s

1980s

1990s–2000s

Notes

References

External links

Discography
Discographies of British artists
Pop music group discographies
Rock music group discographies
Disco discographies